Martin Netolický (born 22 September 1982, in Ústí nad Orlicí) is a Czech politician, Governor of Pardubice Region since 2012, Member of Regional Assembly of Pardubice Region since 2008 and Member of City Assembly of Česká Třebová since 2006.

References

External links
 Profile on website of Pardubice Region

1982 births
Living people
Czech Social Democratic Party governors
Masaryk University alumni
People from Ústí nad Orlicí